Wang Yafan was the defending champion, but she chose to participate in Strasbourg instead.

Anastasia Pivovarova won the title, defeating Lu Jingjing in the final, 6–4, 6–4.

Seeds

Main draw

Finals

Top half

Bottom half

References 
 Main draw

Jinyuan Cup - Singles